Alfred Wolf may refer to:

 Alfred Wolf (sailor) (1923–1943), United States Navy sailor
 USS Alfred Wolf (DE-544), a proposed World War II United States Navy John C. Butler-class destroyer escort
 Alfred Wolf (rabbi) (1915–2004), German-born American rabbi
 Alfred P. Wolf (1923–1998), American nuclear and organic chemist